Twin Lakes State Park is a  state park on the western shore of Lake Roland in Houghton County, Michigan. It is located in the Elm River Township, Michigan along M-26.

Activities and amenities

References

External links
Twin Lakes State Park Michigan Department of Natural Resources
Twin Lakes State Park Map Michigan Department of Natural Resources

Protected areas of Houghton County, Michigan
State parks of Michigan
Protected areas established in 1964
1964 establishments in Michigan
IUCN Category III